The Huay Chivo is a legendary Maya beast. It is a half-man, half-beast creature, with burning red eyes, and is specific to the Yucatán Peninsula. It is reputed to be an evil sorcerer who can transform himself into a supernatural animal, usually a goat, dog or deer, in order to prey upon livestock. In recent times, it has become associated with the chupacabras. The Huay Chivo is specific to the southeastern Mexican states of Yucatán, Campeche and Quintana Roo. Alleged Huay Chivo activity is sporadically reported in the regional press. Local Maya near the town of Valladolid, in Yucatán, believe the Huay Chivo is an evil sorcerer that is capable of transforming into a goat to do mischief and eat livestock.    

The Huay Chivo is a local variation of the Mesoamerican Nahual.

Etymology
The name Huay Chivo combines Spanish and Yucatec Mayan terms. Huay or Uay comes from Waay in Yucatec Maya, meaning sorcerer, spirit or animal familiar, while Chivo is Spanish for goat, literally meaning sorcerer-goat; it is also known as the Chivo Brujo, an entirely Spanish phrase meaning the same thing.

See also
Black dog (ghost)
Chonchon
Chupacabra
Nahual
Skin-walker
Soucouyant
Therianthropy
Wayob
Ijiraq

References
 Burchell, Simon (2007) Phantom Black Dogs in Latin America, Heart of Albion Press,

Further reading
Mendoza, Adriana Leona Rosales. "“Toda la creencia está allá”. Linderos interculturales, espacios y derechos en migrantes agrícolas temporales de la península de Yucatán en Quebec." Estudios de Cultura Maya 48 (2016): 193-222. 
Xiu-Chacón, G. "El arte curativo de los Mayas y los primeros médicos de la Península de Yucatán, México." Rev Biomed 9 (1998): 38-43. 

Maya legendary creatures
Mexican folklore
Yucatán Peninsula
Campeche
Quintana Roo
Therianthropy
Belizean folklore